Emilie of Saxony (27 July 1516 – 9 April 1591) was the third wife of Margrave George the Pious of Brandenburg-Ansbach. Since his two earlier wives died before his accession, she was the only one to hold the title of Margravine.

Life 
Emilie was the daughter of the Duke Henry IV of Saxony and his wife Catherine of Mecklenburg. She was a member of the House of Wettin.

On 25 August 1533 she married the much older George of Brandenburg, the future Margrave of Brandenburg-Ansbach, who had been recognized as the duke of Silesia. He also administered Brandenburg-Kulmbach on behalf of Albert, the son of his deceased brother Casimir. The marriage produced the heir he had hoped for: George Frederick, later Margrave of Brandenburg-Ansbach.

After the death of her husband in 1543, Emilie was the legal guardian of her minor son George Frederick until 1556. She provided him with his profound and humanistic education. However, the regency of Brandenburg-Ansbach was administered jointly by the reigning Electors of Saxony, Electors of Brandenburg, and the Landgrave of Hesse, Philip I.

Emilie was described as wise, virtuous and pious. She was a strict Lutheran and actively opposed Catholicism in the territories of her husband and son. In later life she retired to her widow seat.

Offspring 
Her children with George were the following
 Sophie (1535–1587)
 married in 1560 Duke Henry XI of Legnica (1539–1588)
 Barbara (1536–1591)
 Dorothy Catherine (1538–1604)
 married in 1556 Henry V, Burgrave of Plauen, Burgrave of Meissen
 George Frederick (1539–1603), Margrave of Brandenburg-Ansbach
 married first, in 1558, Princess Elisabeth of Brandenburg-Küstrin (1540–1578)
 second, in 1579, Princess Sophie of Brunswick-Lüneburg (1563–1639)

Ancestors

References 

  (mentioned in the article about her son)

External links 
 
 http://www.guide2womenleaders.com/womeninpower/Womeninpower1540.htm

|-

1516 births
1591 deaths
Margravines of Germany
House of Wettin
Albertine branch
Daughters of monarchs